The 1902 Philadelphia Athletics season was a season in American baseball. The team finished first in the American League with a record of 83 wins and 53 losses.

Regular season 

In 1902, the Philadelphia Phillies obtained an injunction, effective only in Pennsylvania, barring Athletics' second baseman Nap Lajoie from playing baseball for any team other than the Phillies. Lajoie had played for the Athletics in 1901, and appeared in just one game in 1902 before the injunction went into effect. The American League responded by transferring Lajoie's contract to the Cleveland Bronchos, who were subsequently known as the "Naps" in Lajoie's honor for several seasons.

Season standings

Record vs. opponents

Roster

Player stats

Batting

Starters by position 
Note: Pos = Position; G = Games played; AB = At bats; H = Hits; Avg. = Batting average; HR = Home runs; RBI = Runs batted in

Other batters 
Note: G = Games played; AB = At bats; H = Hits; Avg. = Batting average; HR = Home runs; RBI = Runs batted in

Pitching

Starting pitchers 
Note: G = Games pitched; IP = Innings pitched; W = Wins; L = Losses; ERA = Earned run average; SO = Strikeouts

Other pitchers 
Note: G = Games pitched; IP = Innings pitched; W = Wins; L = Losses; ERA = Earned run average; SO = Strikeouts

Notes

References 
1902 Philadelphia Athletics team page at Baseball Reference
1902 Philadelphia Athletics team page at www.baseball-almanac.com

Oakland Athletics seasons
Philadelphia Athletics season
American League champion seasons
Oakland